The slender redfin (Pseudobarbus tenuis) is an African freshwater fish species in the family Cyprinidae.

It is endemic to South Africa, and becoming rare due to habitat destruction and the impact of invasive species.

References 

Pseudobarbus
Freshwater fish of South Africa
Fish described in 1938
Taxonomy articles created by Polbot